Professing Criticism: Essays on the Organization of Literary Study is a 2022 nonfiction collection of essays written by John Guillory.

In response to a review by Bruce Robbins (academic), Guillory asked “how we justify what we do. Does this justification necessarily entail a claim to political efficacy? . . .” From Guilllory's perspective, “[t]he conflation of professional literary study with the criticism of society has aggravated to an insupportable degree the tendency of scholars to overestimate their social impact, and to assert the political efficacy of their work where it is perhaps least to be found. . . .  At the least, we professors might come up with a better way of talking about the profession of studying literature, and a better way to promote intelligent reading as an indispensable practice of an educated citizenry. Is the cultivation of the craft of reading not something we know how to do, if only we could acknowledge it as our vocation? Is there not a political task here to which we can point, without undue self-congratulation?”

Table of Contents 
Preface

Part One: The Formation and Deformation of Literary Study

Chapter 1 Institution of Professions

Chapter 2 Professing Criticism

Chapter 3 Critique of Critical Criticism

Part Two: Organizing Literature: Foundations, Antecedents, Consequences

Chapter 4 Monuments and Documents: On the Object of Study in the Humanities

Chapter 5 The Postrhetorical Condition

Chapter 6 Two Failed Disciplines: Belles Lettres and Philology

Chapter 7 The Location of Literature

Chapter 8 The Contradictions of Global English

Part Three: Professionalization and Its Discontents

Chapter 9 On the Permanent Crisis of Graduate Education

Chapter 10 Evaluating Scholarship in the Humanities

Chapter 11 Composition and the Demand for Writing

Chapter 12 The Question of Lay Reading

Conclusion: Ratio Studiorum

References

2022 books
Non-fiction books
Essays
Literary criticism